Midakanatti is a village in the Gokak Taluk and Belagavi District of Karnataka State in India. It is administered by the Midakanatti Panchayat (village council). It is located 52 km east of the divisional headquarters in Belagavi, 25 km from the town of Gokak, and 507 km from the state capital, Bengaluru.

Midakanatti's postal code is 591344 and its post office is at Khanagaon.

Gokak (25 km), Bailhongal (22 km), Belagavi (52 km), Mudalgi (42 km), and Saundatti (45 km) are the nearest towns and cities.

Getting there

By road
Gokak 25 km, Belgaum 52 km and state of capital Bangaluru 507 km distance by road.

By rail
The nearest Railway stations to Midakanatti are at Pachhapur 16 km, Sulebhavi 19 km, Gokak Road (Konnur) 32 km and Ghataprabha 34 km, There is also a major railway station at Belagavi railway station 50 km.

By air
The nearest Airport to Midakanatti is Belgaum Airport, located about 38 km southeast in the town of Sambra.

Gallery

References

Villages in Belagavi district